Below is a list of squads used in the 1957 African Cup of Nations.

Egypt
Coach:  Mourad Fahmy

Ethiopia
Coach:  Moustafa Zewde

Sudan
Coach:  József Háda

External links
African Nations Cup 1957 - Details and Scorers RSSSF
Egyptian Results in African Cup of Nations

Africa Cup of Nations squads
Squads